The Church of Our Lady of Lourdes is a Roman Catholic parish church located in the neighbourhood of Malvín, Montevideo, Uruguay.

The parish was established on 4 February 1934 by Archbishop Juan Francisco Aragone. The temple is dedicated to Our Lady of Lourdes.

There was a project in the 1960s to build a bigger, modern church in this place. Eladio Dieste designed the reinforced ceramic building, but only the apse was built. Curiously, the project was built instead in Spain: the parish church of San Juan de Ávila, Alcalá de Henares.

References

1934 establishments in Uruguay
Roman Catholic church buildings in Montevideo
Malvín
Eladio Dieste buildings
20th-century Roman Catholic church buildings in Uruguay